Government Mental Health Centre, Kozhikode is a public mental health institution and hospital run by Government of Kerala, located at Puthiyara Pottamal Road, Kozhikode, Kerala. The hospital serves northern Kerala and neighbouring states.

Notable people

Dr S. Santhakumar, who was appointed as the superintendent of the hospital in 1962. He was the first qualified psychiatrist in the history of the hospital.
Dr. R.L. Saritha, former superintendent of the hospital and now serves as the director of health services, Government of Kerala.
Dr. N. Rajendran, former superintendent of the hospital.
Dr K.C. Remasan, superintendent (2018 to present).

References

Mental health in India
Kozhikode
Kerala
Government of Kerala